Jerome Hill is an American basketball player. Hill played college basketball for the Gardner–Webb Runnin' Bulldogs. He was named to multiple all-conference teams in his time attending Gardner–Webb University.

Iceland
In 2015, Hill signed with Úrvalsdeild club Tindastóll. After a disappointing performance, he was released by the club on January 31, 2016. A few days later he signed with Keflavík. In his first game with Keflavík, Hill was two assists shy of a triple double and ended with 22 points, 11 rebounds and 8 assists. In the playoffs, Hill and Keflavík faced his old team in the quarter-finals. After a heated series, Keflavík lost the series 1–3.

In 2017, Hill signed with Puente Alto of the Chilean LNB and went on to average 19.8 points, 9.7 rebounds and 4.2 assists in 33 games during the 2017–2018 season. He returned to the team the following season.

References

External links
Profile at eurobasket.com
Profile at realgm.com
Profile at draftexpress.com
Úrvalsdeild stats at kki.is

1992 births
Living people
American expatriate basketball people in Iceland
Basketball players from Georgia (U.S. state)
Gardner–Webb Runnin' Bulldogs men's basketball players
Shooting guards
Small forwards
Úrvalsdeild karla (basketball) players
Keflavík men's basketball players
Ungmennafélagið Tindastóll men's basketball players
American men's basketball players